Hope Valley College, Castleton Road (A6187), Hope, Hope Valley, Derbyshire in England is an academy school, adjacent to the Peakshole Water, in the High Peak district for pupils aged 11 to 16.

History
The school was first opened in September 1958 but did not officially open until July 1959 and has celebrated its 50th anniversary. The college also received a specialism in Applied Learning with Gifted and Talented in March 2009 making it the first school in Derbyshire to be awarded three specialisms. In September 2019 the school joined Chorus Education Trust, a local multi-academy trust led by Silverdale School in Sheffield. A new Principal, Mrs Gaynor Jones, was also appointed.

Admissions
Hope Valley College is a smaller than average secondary school. Students travel from across North Derbyshire to attend the school. It follows the admissions arrangements run by Derbyshire County Council.

The college does not have a sixth form, but it opened a post-16 education centre for children with learning difficulties and disabilities in September 2012.

Hope Valley students have priority access into Silverdale Sixth Form (part of Chorus Education Trust), which is regularly one of the highest achieving sixth forms in Sheffield.

Academic performance
In 2019 the school achieved the third highest Progress 8 score in Derbyshire out of all non-selective schools. The Progress 8 score was +0.28 which is above average.

The college has a wide range of in school and after school clubs, including, 'Big Band', coeducational choir, many different music groups, drama club, textiles club, annual musical performances and different sporting activities/clubs, along with more ever expanding extra-curricular clubs, and different academic groups outside of school.

In February 2018, Hope Valley College received an academic performance score by Ofsted of 'Inadequate'. The Ofsted inspectors proclaim “[The senior leader's] poor communication with each other and with staff is hindering school improvement.".

Hope Valley College became a new academy within Chorus Education Trust on 1 September 2019. Ofsted usually inspects all new schools within their third year of operation. Until that time, there is no current Ofsted judgement on the school.

At the heart of the community 
Hope Valley College is at the heart of the local community. During the 2020 Covid-19 lockdown Design & Technology staff in the school used their department's machines to produce protective face visors for frontline staff. The school also hosts the annual Hope Valley Film Festival, run by local parents, which in 2020 welcome British long-distance runner, Nicky Spinks, as their guest of honour. Fortnightly car boot sales are run in the school grounds during the spring and summer.

Every year the school provides heart screenings for its Year 11 students to identify those at risk from sudden cardiac death. Screenings are also available to the local community. Extensive fundraising takes place in the local community to support this initiative.

References

External links
 School Website
 Ofsted Report

Academies in Derbyshire
Secondary schools in Derbyshire